Xia Yi (born 1968, Shanghai) is a Chinese singer and actress  working in Taiwan.

She allegedly had an affair with Ni Min-jan, which is said to have led to the latter's suicide.

References

External links

1968 births
Living people
Actresses from Shanghai
Singers from Shanghai
21st-century Chinese women singers